Pearl Lagoon is a municipality that is often time called just Lagoon and was historically known as English Bank. It is located in the South Caribbean Coast Autonomous Region of Nicaragua. It is the most important town of the largest coastal lagoon also by the name of Pearl Lagoon in the South Caribbean Coast Autonomous Region of Nicaragua and which the name of the town is derived from. As of 2021, Pearl Lagoon Municipality had a population of 20,557.

History

Pearl Lagoon, along with the eastern half of present-day Nicaragua, was a British protectorate from 1655 until 1860, a period when the region was called the Mosquito Coast.

In the period before 1894, eastern Nicaragua was a British protectorate, ruled through a line of Miskito kings. About a century ago, Pearl Lagoon was considered to be the second capital of the Moskitian Kingdom when the last Miskito King took up residence in the town of Pearl City , the capital of the municipality.

At that time, Pearl Lagoon was called "the Granada of the Mosquitia" by one of the conquistadores of the Pacific Coast because of its beauty and the booming ship traffic.

An 18th century cannon situated on the municipality wharf of Pearl Lagoon has an inscription commemorating battles between liberal and conservative factions. The cannon was never fired in anger, it was used only for celebrations.

Culture

Most of the inhabitants are Creole, but a large number of Miskito, Mestizo and some Garifuna are also present. The Mestizo people started migrating in the late 90s, some from the city of El Rama and some from the northern part of the municipality of Pearl Lagoon.

Similar to Bluefields, May Pole is a big celebration among the people. Now within the same month of May, people from all over the municipality would come together in the community of Pearl Lagoon to celebrate and share their different cultures and traditions.

The main communities are Haulover, Kakabila, Marshall Point, Pearl Lagoon, Orinoco, La Fe, Raitipura, Brown Bank, Tasbapauni, Set Net Point, Wawashan, San Vicente, Awas and Pedregal.

Sports

Pearl Lagoon was the home to four local baseball teams that played during the dry seasons on Sundays. The four teams were: Sweet Pearly, First Stop, The Young Brave, and the Haulover Tigers.

Pitchers Albert Williams and Devern Hansack, both natives of Pearl Lagoon, played in the Major League Baseball. Although those teams no longer exist, baseball is still one of the main sports in the community which is also played in the dry season on Sundays at the Harry and Maggie Taylor municipal stadium.

Transportation

The municipality of Pearl Lagoon is located just north of Bluefields, the capital of the South Caribbean Coast Autonomous Region, and can be reach by boat and Panga boat.

In 2006, the IDR initiated the construction of a new rural road of 17 km from Kukra Hill to Pearl Lagoon. The road is now reconstructed and as of today, it permits direct access to Managua from Pearl Lagoon and was financed by the World Bank (WB) through the International Development Association (IDA).

For more than 10 years, there has been a bus that travels every day from Pearl Lagoon to Kukra Hill and back. Around three years ago, the owner of that same bus started a new destination directly from Pearl Lagoon to Managua one time per week.

Education 
In Pearl Lagoon, there are three schools. The Beulah Light Burn school which is only for primary and pre-escolar students, the Pearl Lagoon National Institute only for Secondary students and the Pearl Lagoon Academy of Excellence (PLACE) for pre-escolar, primary and secondary students.

References

Municipalities of the South Caribbean Coast Autonomous Region